A personal budget (for the budget of one person) or household budget (for the budget of one or more person living in the same dwelling) is a plan for the coordination of the resources (income) and expenses of an individual or a household.

Purposes of creating a personal budget 
Personal budgets are usually created to help an individual or a household of people to control their spending and achieve their financial goals. Having a budget can help people feel more in control of their finances and make it easier for them to not overspend and to save money. People who budget their money are less likely to obtain large debts, and are more likely to be able to lead comfortable retired lifes and to be prepared for emergencies.

Methods of personal budgeting 
In the most basic form of creating a personal budget the person needs to calculate their net income, track their spending over a set period of time, set goals based on the information previously  gathered, make a plan to achieve these goals, and adjust their spending based on the plan. There exist many methods of budgeting to help people do this.

5 Essential Steps Budgeting 
This method involves assessing one's financial situation, setting realistic financial goals, allocating income, tracking spending and adjusting the budget, and regularly reviewing and revising the budget. These steps can help individuals gain better control over their finances and achieve their financial goals.

50/30/20 budget 
The 50/30/20 budget is a simple plan that sorts personal expenses into three categories: "needs" (basic necessities), "wants", and savings. 50% of one's net income then goes towards needs, 30% towards wants, and 20% towards savings.

Pay yourself first method (80/20 budget) 
In the pay yourself first budget people first save at least 20% of their net income, and then freely spend the remaining 80%. They can also choose a 70/30, 60/40, or 50/50 budget for more savings. The most important part of this method is to put one's savings apart before spending on anything else.

Sub-savings accounts method 
This method is a variation of the pay yourself first budget, in which people create multiple savings accounts, each for one specific goal (such as a vacation or a new car), and each with an amount of money that should be reached by a specific date. They then divide the amount of money needed by the timeline to calculate how much they should save each month.

Envelope method (cash-only budgeting) 
For this method, people need to use cash instead of debit or credit cards. They need to allocate their net income into categories (e.g. groceries), withdraw the cash allocated for each category, and put them into envelopes. Any time they want to buy something in one of the categories, they only take the designated envelope so that they cannot overspend.

Zero-based budgeting 
In zero-based budgeting, all of one's net income must be allocated ahead of spending.

Personal finance softwares and apps 
Several personal finance softwares and mobile apps have been developed to help people with managing their money. Some of them can be used for budgeting and expense tracking, others mainly for one's investment porftolio. There are both free and paid options.

References 

Budgets
Budget